Tasker–Morris station is a rapid transit passenger rail station on SEPTA's Broad Street Line. It is located at 1600 South Broad Street in South Philadelphia, Pennsylvania and serves only local trains. The station is named for the nearby Tasker Street to the north and Morris Street to the south. In between the two streets is a customer service office for the Philadelphia Gas Works.

The streets Tasker and Morris were named after Thomas P. Tasker and Henry and Stephen Morris, the two families that founded the companies Morris, Tasker & Morris, and later the Pascal Iron Works, which occupied a site on Fifth Street between the two streets that would later take their name.

The song "Tasker-Morris Station" by The Menzingers is about the station. The song "Wedding Singer" by Modern Baseball also references the station.

Station layout 
There are four street entrances to the station, two at Broad and Tasker streets, as well as two at Broad and Morris streets.

Gallery

References

External links 

SEPTA Broad Street Line stations
Railway stations in the United States opened in 1938
Railway stations in Philadelphia
Railway stations located underground in Pennsylvania
1938 establishments in Pennsylvania